Orlando Niebles  (born August 4, 1985 in Barranquilla) is a Colombian footballer, who is currently playing for Uniautónoma.

Career
The defender played for Atlético Junior,  Depor Aguablanca FC and Cúcuta Deportivo  in the Copa Mustang.

Notes

1985 births
Living people
Sportspeople from Barranquilla
Association football defenders
Colombian footballers
Atlético F.C. footballers
Atlético Junior footballers
Cúcuta Deportivo footballers
20th-century Colombian people
21st-century Colombian people